Jefferson Station (formerly named Market East Station) is an underground SEPTA Regional Rail station located on Market Street in Philadelphia, Pennsylvania. It is the easternmost of the three Center City stations of the SEPTA Regional Rail system, and is part of the Center City Commuter Connection, which connects the former Penn Central commuter lines with the former Reading Company commuter lines.

While the station's official SEPTA address is 12th and Filbert streets, it actually spans two city blocks, from 12th to 10th streets just north of Market Street. In 2014, the station saw approximately 26,000 passengers every weekday.

History

Market East Station was built as part of the $300-million Center City Commuter Connection project, which constructed a tunnel between the former Suburban Station and an existing viaduct near Temple University station and unified commuter rail service in Philadelphia. The tunnel included provisions for an "11th Street Station." During planning stages, the station was named Market East, a name sometimes used to refer to the retail corridor on Market Street east of City Hall. During construction in May 1984, the tunnel suffered minor damage due to an above-ground fire in an abandoned building on 10th Street.

The station opened on November 10, 1984, replacing the 1893-built Reading Terminal which had closed four days earlier. Part of the station actually sits below the Reading Terminal building, which still houses Reading Terminal Market and also now includes part of the Pennsylvania Convention Center. When the convention center first opened in 1993, a new entrance to the station was built into the Reading Terminal headhouse at the northeast corner of 12th and Market streets.

In July 2012, Amtrak identified Market East as its preferred Philadelphia station for a future high-speed rail line along the Northeast Corridor between Boston South Station and Washington Union Station. The new corridor would be built with fewer curves, allowing for trains to achieve much higher speeds and eventually reach the goal of a 37-minute trip between Philadelphia and New York Penn Station.

Rumors first circulated in August 2014 that the station would be renamed. On September 4, 2014, SEPTA announced the station's renaming from Market East to Jefferson, after Jefferson Health – whose Thomas Jefferson University Hospital is a few blocks from the station – purchased the naming rights. The length of the $4 million contract for the Jefferson Station name is five years, with the option to keep it for an additional four years for $3.4 million. This was SEPTA's second naming rights sale; Pattison station was renamed AT&T station in 2010, and is now named NRG station.

The station is connected to the concourse level of Fashion District Philadelphia, a shopping mall that replaced the Gallery at Market East mall in September 2019. The station was connected to the Gallery II (the mall's 1984 expansion) section of the mall, and the design of the new mall preserved the connection to Jefferson Station.

Services

Jefferson Station is served by all Regional Rail lines except the limited-service Cynwyd Line, which terminates at Suburban Station. In FY 2005, the average total weekday boardings at this station was 11,848, making it the second busiest station in the Regional Rail system.

Through the Fashion District mall, Jefferson Station is connected to SEPTA's Market–Frankford Line and Broad–Ridge Spur subway lines, as well as the PATCO Speedline.

Jefferson Station is located adjacent to multiple surface bus routes operated by both SEPTA and NJ Transit. Additionally, the Philadelphia Greyhound Terminal is located immediately north of the station across Filbert Street.

Station layout

Stainless steel and large plate-glass windows are a major design element throughout the station's concourse, with large color tile murals depicting the four seasons adorning the walls. The upper seating area contains benches facing windows that look down onto the tracks. These windows admit light from the street down to track level much like a clerestory, although this natural light only fills a small portion of the station.

Each  platform, long enough for ten railcars, is divided into "A" and "B" sections so that two different Regional Rail trains may utilize the same track at the same time.

To the east, there is a sharp curve north where trains are limited to about 20 to 25 mph (32 to 40 km/h), and then another set of cross-overs before climbing a 2.5% incline towards the elevated Temple University station.

Image gallery

References

External links

 Jefferson Station | SEPTA
 12th and Market street entrance from Google Maps Street View
 11th and Filbert streets entrance from Google Maps Street View
 10th and Filbert streets entrance from Google Maps Street View

SEPTA Regional Rail stations
Railway stations in the United States opened in 1984
Railway stations in Philadelphia
Market East, Philadelphia
Railway stations located underground in Pennsylvania
Stations on the SEPTA Main Line
Wilmington/Newark Line